The 1993 Polish Speedway season was the 1993 season of motorcycle speedway in Poland.

Individual

Polish Individual Speedway Championship
The 1993 Individual Speedway Polish Championship final was held on 19 September at Bydgoszcz. Tomasz Gollob won the Polish Championship for the second consecutive season.

Golden Helmet
The 1993 Golden Golden Helmet organised by the Polish Motor Union (PZM) was the 1993 event for the league's leading riders. The final was held at Wrocław on the 30 October. Dariusz Śledź won the Golden Helmet.

Junior Championship
 winner - Tomasz Bajerski

Silver Helmet
 winner - Tomasz Kruk

Bronze Helmet
 winner - Piotr Baron

Pairs

Polish Pairs Speedway Championship
The 1993 Polish Pairs Speedway Championship was the 1993 edition of the Polish Pairs Speedway Championship. The final was held on 1 May at Grudziądz.

Team

Team Speedway Polish Championship
The 1993 Team Speedway Polish Championship was the 1993 edition of the Team Polish Championship. WTS Wrocław won the gold medal. Their team included riders such as Tommy Knudsen, Dariusz Śledź and Piotr Baron.

First Division

Second Division

References

Poland Individual
Poland Team
Speedway
1993 in Polish speedway